The 2000 Asian Acrobatic Gymnastics Championships were the fifth edition of the Asian Acrobatic Gymnastics Championships, and were held in Kazakhstan, in September 2000.

Medal summary

References

A
Asian Gymnastics Championships
International gymnastics competitions hosted by Kazakhstan
2000 in Kazakhstani sport